Piercarlo Beroldi (8 June 1928 – 21 October 2015) was an Italian sports shooter. He competed in the 50 metre pistol event at the 1960 Summer Olympics.

References

External links
 

1928 births
2015 deaths
Italian male sport shooters
Olympic shooters of Italy
Shooters at the 1960 Summer Olympics
Sportspeople from the Province of Pavia